Théo De Joncker (11 April 1894, in Brussels – 12 July 1964, in Asse) was a Belgian composer.

Biography 
Théo De Joncker was a student of August de Boeck and Paul Gilson. For years he conducted the orchestra of the Belgian National Radio (NIR), but he also enjoyed a conducting career outside of Belgium. As a composer, he belonged to the Brussels group Les Synthétistes. This group was found by students of Paul Gilson as a way to celebrate their teacher's 60th birthday and included Francis de Bourguignon, Théo De Joncker, Marcel Poot, Maurice Schoemaker, Jules Strens, René Bernier, and Robert Otlet.

Compositions

Orchestral works 
 1917 Filosofische gedachten van een draaiorgelspeler for orchestra
 1918 Hedda Gabler for orchestra
 1927 Breugeliaansche schets for orchestra
 1939 Sinfonia burlesca for orchestra
 1939 Sinfonie im klassischen Stil for orchestra
 1943 Symfonie nr.3 for orchestra
 1944 Muzikaal portret van Bernard Shaw for orchestra
 Allegro for chamber orchestra
 Boere-Charleston for tenor and orchestra - text: Paul van Ostayen
 Cello Concerto for cello and orchestra
 De laatste oogenblikken van Lodewijk XI for small orchestra
 Don Quichotte rêve... for orchestra
 Fantasia - Serenata for flute and orchestra
 Historiette pour bébé for strings
 Introduction et rondo capricio for bassoon and orchestra
 Le glas for orchestra
 Rapsodie vénézuélienne for orchestra
 Sérénade for violin and orchestra
 Symfonische proloog for orchestra
 Vlaamse dans I for orchestra

Brassband works 
 Chant mystique, for brass band
 Charles Stratton, comical fairytale for brass band
 Deux Extraits du Jardin des Supplices, based on a novel by Octave Mirbeau
 Gamineries - Guitenstreken, for brassband
 Marche, for brassband
 Polomé, for brassband
 For Paul Gilson, for brassband

Choir works 
 Ach, mijn bietje, jij zingt zo schone for mixed choir and piano - text: Guido Gezelle
 Anneessens for mixed choir and piano - text: Frans de Cort
 Daer ging een pater langs het land for male or female choir and piano
 De mei for choir a cappella - text: G. W. Loovendael
 De pen for mixed choir and piano - text: Jan A. Van Droogenbroeck
 Des winters als het reghent for male or female choir and piano
 Minnekepoes for choir a cappella - text: Jan A. Van Droogenbroeck

Chamber music 
 1917 Conte pour quatuor for flute, oboe, clarinet and bassoon
 1917 Novelette pour trio for flute, oboe and viola
 1938 Drie vertelseltjes for oboe, clarinet, bassoon and horn
 1963 Concerto for flute, oboe, clarinet, bassoon and horn in F
 Prélude for oboe, clarinet, bassoon and horn
 Quintette for flute, oboe, clarinet, horn and bassoon

Vocal music with orchestra or instruments 
 1927 Verselets à mon premier né for tenor and orchestra - text: Clotilde de Surville
 1938 De messias for Recitant and piano - text: Dirk Vansina
 De Vlaming staat zijn eigen taal en zeden af for mezzo-soprano and orchestra - text: Guido Gezelle
 De wilde jacht for mezzo-soprano and orchestra - text: Willem Gijssels
 Eerste boek van Schmol for middle voice and orchestra - text: Paul van Ostayen
 Hei da lieve dreupel water for mezzo-soprano and orchestra - text: Guido Gezelle
 Het meezennestje for soprano and orchestra - text: Guido Gezelle
 Het zonnelied van Achnaton for Recitant and piano - text: J. Coutrijn
 Morgenstond for alto and orchestra - text: Guido Gezelle
 O Mocht ik for mezzo-soprano and orchestra - text: Guido Gezelle
 Slaapt, slaapt, kindje slaapt for soprano, mixed choir and piano ad. libitum - text: Guido Gezelle
 Stilleven for mezzo-soprano and orchestra - text: Staf Van der Loo
 Tot de Mane for mezzo-soprano and orchestra - text: Guido Gezelle
 Winden gingen te rust for mezzo-soprano and orchestra - text: Wies Moens
 Wintermuggen for soprano and orchestra - text: Guido Gezelle
 Zonnezoen for soprano and orchestra - text: Jef Mennekens

Works for piano 
 1915 Le chien qui lache sa proie pour l'ombre
 1915 Le renard et les raisins
 Eille - Walsje
 Esquisse sur le nom "ANNA"
 Gaminerie
 Il s'éveille.
 Pianowerken
 Pièce pour piano sur le nom de Fauré
 Vlaamse dans

Sources 
 Francis Pieters: Grootmeesters van de Simfonie en de Blaasmuziek - De Sythetisten, in: FEDEKAMNIEUWS Tweemaandelijks orgaan van de Fedekam Vlaanderen, 27th volume, nr. 3- June 1982, pp. 178–181
 Karel De Schrijver: Bibliografie der Belgische Toonkunstenaars sedert 1800, Leuven : Vlaamse Drukkerij, 1958, 152 p.
 Jozef Robijns, Miep Zijlstra: Algemene muziekencyclopedie, Haarlem: De Haan, (1979)-1984, 
 Franz Stieger: Opernlexikon - Teil II: Komponisten. 1, Band A-F, Tutzing: Hans Schneider, 1975–1983, 371 p., 
 Franz Stieger: Opernlexikon - Teil II: Komponisten. 2, Band G-M, Tutzing: Hans Schneider, 1975–1983, 373-772 p., 
 Paul Frank, Burchard Bulling, Florian Noetzel, Helmut Rosner: Kurzgefasstes Tonkünstler Lexikon - Zweiter Teil: Erganzungen und Erweiterungen seit 1937, 15. Aufl., Wilhelmshaven: Heinrichshofen, Band 1: A-K. 1974. ; Band 2: L-Z. 1976. 
 Storm Bull: Index to biographies of contemporary composers, Vol. II, Metuchen, N.J.: Scarecrow Press, 1974, 567 p., 
 Jean-Marie Londeix: 125 ans de musique pour saxophone, Paris: Leduc, 1971

1894 births
1964 deaths
20th-century classical composers
Belgian classical composers
Belgian male classical composers
Musicians from Brussels
20th-century Belgian male musicians